Tella is a village and rural commune in the Cercle of Sikasso in the Sikasso Region of southern Mali. The commune covers an area of 511 square kilometers and includes six villages. In the 2009 census it had a population of 4,372. The village of Tella, the administrative center (chef-lieu) of the commune, is 82 km northwest of Sikasso.

References

External links
.

Communes of Sikasso Region